Eduard Fenzl (1808, in Krummnußbaum – 1879, in Vienna) was an Austrian botanist.

Life and contributions 
An obituary notes "[h]e was Professor of Botany and Director of the Imperial Botanical Cabinet, a member of the Vienna Academy of Sciences, and Vice-President of the Vienna Horticultural Society."

Fenzl made contributions towards Karl Friedrich Philipp von Martius's Flora Brasiliensis and to Stephan Endlicher's Enumeratio plantarum quas in Novae Hollandiae, etc. He was the author of Pugillus plantarum novarum Syriæ et Tauri occidentalis primus (1842).

The plant genus Fenzlia is named in his honor.

Works

As author 
 Dissertatio inauguralis medico-botanica sistens extensionem et distributionem geographicam Alsinearum familiae naturalis per terras arcticas partemque zonae temperatae orbis antiqui (1833)
 Sertum Cabulicum. Enumeratio Plantarum Quas in Itinere Inter Dera-Ghazee-Khan Et Cabul, Mensibus Majo Et Junio 1833 Collegit Dr Martin Honigberger. Accedunt Novarum Vel Minus Cognitarum Stirpium Icones Et Descriptiones Part 1 (1836)
 Novarum stirpium decas I-X (1839)
 Pugillus Plantarum novarum Syriae et Tauri occidentalis primus (1842)
 Illustrationes et descriptiones plantarum novarum Syriae et Tauri occidentalis (1843)
 Über die Stellung der Gattung Oxera im natürlichen Systeme (1843)
 Über die Blütezeit der Paulownia imperialis (1851)
 … Differential-Charaktere der Arten der Gattung Cyperus (1855)
 Bildliche Naturgeschichte des Pflanzenreiches in Umrissen nach seinen wichtigsten Ordnungen (1855)

As editor 
  Theodor Kotschy. Abbildungen und Beschreibungen neuer und seltener Thiere (1843)
 Franz Xaver Freiherr von Wulfen. Flora Norica Phanerogama (1858)

References

Further reading 
 H. W. Reichardt. "Eduard Fenzl". In: Österreichische Botanische Zeitschrift, 12:1, 1862

External links 

 Illustration of Fenzl

1808 births
1879 deaths
19th-century Austrian botanists
Academic staff of the University of Vienna
People from Melk District